Elsa Lunghini, stage name Elsa (born 20 May 1973), is a French singer and actress. She was a teenage pop-star in the late-1980s. In 1986, she was the youngest singer to reach number one in the French charts, with the single "T'en va pas", and she went on to sell millions of records during the decade. Elsa, her album of 1988, had achieved double-platinum status by 1993.

Biography
Daughter of George Lunghini (actor, photographer and songwriter) and Christiane Jobert (painter and also sister of actress Marlène Jobert and Charles Jobert, a camera operator and director of photography), she is of Italian origin on her father's side, and of Sephardic Jewish origin on her mother's side. She is a cousin of actresses Eva Green and Josephine Jobert.

Lunghini first performed in a movie at age seven, in 1981, in Claude Miller's Garde à vue (also starring Romy Schneider).

She was the youngest artist to be in the main program at the Olympia (Paris), at 17, in October 1990 as well as the youngest to have a number 1 hit in the Top 50 in France. At 13, in 1986, she remained number 1 for eight weeks with "T'en va pas" (soundtrack of the movie La Femme de ma vie). The song was composed by the Italian Romano Musumarra, who had worked and helped produce hits for 1980s singer Jeanne Mas. The song was a hit in France and sold elsewhere in Europe with an English recording.

With the help of her musician father, she recorded her LP Elsa. It sold more than 600,000 copies with hit singles such as "Quelque chose dans mon cœur" ("Something in my heart"), "Jour de neige" ("Snowing day"), "Jamais nous" (with backing vocals by French singer Laurent Voulzy) ("Never us"), "Un Roman d'amitié" (duet with Glenn Medeiros) ("Friend you give me a Reason"), "À la même heure dans deux ans" ("At the same time in two years"). All were top 10 hits. At that time, Lunghini was the only artist to have her first four singles at number one or two. She became popular in the teen press, often compared with Vanessa Paradis.

In 1990, she made her second album, Rien que pour ça ("Only for that"). The songs were produced by her father and Elsa wrote the music for the single of the same name. "Rien que pour ça" was a top 20 hit. Two other excerpts were released: "Pleure doucement" ("Cry softly") and "Qu'est-ce que ça peut lui faire" ("How does she matter"). The two last singles were less successful. She made her first tour, at the Olympia.

In 1992, Lunghini recorded "Bouscule-moi" ("Push me on"), a mid-rock single with more adult lyrics. "Bouscule-moi" was a hit single. Her third album was Douce violence ("Sweet violence"). Two more singles promoted it but they failed to become hits.

In 1996, aged 23, she wrote and composed her fourth album, Chaque jour est un long chemin (Every day is a long way). It sold 20,000. From 20 to 24 September 2004, she gave shows in Paris at the Européen. A live DVD and a live CD went on sale in 2006.

Lunghini takes part annually in the Tour of the Resto du Coeur soup-kitchen charity and helps causes such as Sol En Si.

She has starred in two TV movies: 2002's La mort est rousse and 2004's Trois jours en juin and is involved in a television advertising campaign for Danone yoghurt.

She lives in Paris and, from 1999 to 2006, was the fiancée of former footballer Bixente Lizarazu. They met at a Restos du Coeur concert, in which they were taking part. She is also a spokesperson for the Bout de Vie association, which helps the handicapped.

Discography

Elsa (1988)
Rien que pour ça (1990)
Douce violence (1992)
Chaque jour est un long chemin (1996)
De lave et de sève (2004)
Elsa Lunghini (2008)

Filmography

Cinema:
1981: Garde à vue (de Claude Miller) – Camille (l'enfant)
1985: Train d'enfer (de Roger Hanin) – (uncredited)
1985: Rouge baiser (de Véra Belmont) – Rosa
1986: La Femme de ma vie (de Régis Wargnier) – Éloïse
1987: Où que tu sois (de Alain Bergala) – Anne
1992: Le Retour de Casanova (de Édouard Niermans) – Marcolina
2009: Le portail (Short, by Liam Engle) – Maman
2013: Pauvre Richard! (by Malik Chibane) – Amel

Television:
2002: La Mort est rousse (TV Movie, de Christian Faure) – Charlotte
2005: Trois jours en juin (TV Movie, de Philippe Venault) – Sylvie
2007: Où es-tu ? (de Miguel Courtois) – Suzanne
2009: Aveugle mais pas trop (TV Movie, de Charlotte Brandström) – Emma
2010: La maison des Rocheville (TV, by Jacques Otmezguine) - Sylvana

External links

 
 
 Fan site (in French)

References

1973 births
Actresses from Paris
French film actresses
French people of Algerian-Jewish descent
French people of Italian descent
French television actresses
Jewish French actresses
Living people
Singers from Paris
20th-century French actresses
21st-century French actresses
Ariola Records artists
Warner Records artists
21st-century French singers
21st-century French women singers
Association footballers' wives and girlfriends
French Sephardi Jews
Mizrahi Jews